T'Nia Miller (born 1980) is a British actress, known for her appearances in television series including Witless (2016–2018), Years and Years (2019), Free Rein (2019), The Haunting of Bly Manor (2020), and Foundation (2021).

Career
Miller made her professional acting debut in 2007, in three episodes of the Channel 4 drama series Dubplate Drama as Nadine. She then made appearances in The Bill and Holby City, before her first starring role as JJ in the 2012 feature film Stud Life. After making guest appearances in British television series such as Babylon, Banana, Cucumber, Doctor Who, Guilt and Born to Kill, Miller scored her first starring role as DC Wilton in the BBC Three thriller series Witless, a role she played from 2016 to 2018. In June 2017, she appeared in an episode of the BBC soap opera Doctors as Bev Lomax. In 2019, Miller was cast in the BBC drama miniseries Years and Years as Celeste Bisme-Lyons. Years and Years was created by Russell T Davies, whom Miller had worked with on the Channel 4 programmes Banana and Cucumber. In 2019, she appeared in the Netflix series Free Rein as Claire Wright, In 2020, Miller appeared in the Netflix series Sex Education as Maxine Tarrington, and later in the year, she starred in the Netflix series The Haunting of Bly Manor as Hannah Grose. In 2021, Miller starred in the AMC series La Fortuna as Susan McLean and in the Apple TV+ series Foundation as Zephyr Halima.

Personal life
Miller is openly lesbian. Miller trained at the Guildford School of Acting, from which she graduated in 2004. She is divorced and has two children.

Miller is known for her shaved head, and when asked about it, she said: "I used to hide behind my hair all the time. I had this long, relaxed hair, and I was thinking, 'What am I trying to say? What is that about?' It sort of was a lightbulb moment, and I said: 'You know what? I'm gonna cut it off. I start from ground zero and grow an afro.' I was sitting in the barber shop, and he cut my hair and I fell in love with my skull... and I never turned back. And actually, it's afforded me to be able to play a diverse range of roles – it had totally the opposite effect that I feared. Where I thought I'd be very limited to what I'd be seen for, it's done the opposite. So this was born out of an integrity of loving the self and not having to hide, and loving the fact that I'm an African."

Filmography

References

External links
 

21st-century English actresses
Actresses from London
Actresses from Surrey
Actors from Guildford
Alumni of the Guildford School of Acting
Black British actresses
British people of Jamaican descent
English film actresses
English stage actresses
English television actresses
English lesbian actresses
Living people
LGBT Black British people
1985 births
English LGBT actors
20th-century English LGBT people
21st-century English LGBT people